Kinjikitile "Bokero" Ngwale (died August 4, 1905) was a Tanzanian spiritual medium and a leader of the 1905–1907 Maji Maji Rebellion against colonial rule in German East Africa (present day Tanzania).

Biography
Kinjikitile was a member of the Matumbi people, living in what is now Kilwa District of Lindi Region in Tanzania (then German East Africa, later Tanganyika). The Matumbi practiced religious forms of folk Islam. In 1904, the then relatively unknown Kinjikitile disappeared from his home in Ngarambe. He returned after a few days and said that he had been possessed by a spirit medium called Hongo, believed to take the form of a snake. Kinjikitile claimed to have communicated with the deity Bokera through the spirit Hongo. He encouraged his followers to overlook tribal differences and unite against the Germans. Kinjitkile's reputation grew rapidly, drawing followers from the 100,000 square kilometers the territory encompassed. He told his followers that their ancestors had commanded him to lead a rebellion against the German colonial empire. This helped start the Maji Maji Rebellion. Kinjikitile gave his people 'holy water' to protect them from German bullets.  After a group of Matumbi people attacked the home of a local official in July, 1905, Kinjikitile was arrested by German troops.

He was hanged for treason on August 4, 1905. His brother continued Kinjikitile's work and the rebellion continued until 1907, with over 100,000 or 200-300,000 Africans killed in the German suppression of the revolt. Present-day Tanzanians consider the failed rebellion to have been the first stirring of nationalism, and Kinjikitile "Bokero" Ngwale a proto-national hero.

Legacy in literature 
Tanzanian playwright Ebrahim Hussein wrote a popular play in Swahili language called Kinjeketile, based on the Maji Maji Rebellion.

References

Further reading 
 
 

1905 deaths
Executed Tanzanian people
Year of birth missing
People executed by the German Empire
People executed for treason against Germany
People executed by Germany by hanging
20th-century executions by Germany